Golf is a 1980 video game programmed by Michael Lorenzen and published by Atari, Inc. for the Atari VCS (later called the Atari 2600) based on the sport of the same name. The game allows one or two players to play nine holes of simplified golf.

Gameplay

The area of the hole is rendered in light green, all areas outside the hole are rendered in a medium blue. On the larger holes, the green is rendered as a dark green hole circle with the hole near the center. There are several obstacles that can appear, including trees, sand traps, and water features.

On difficulty A, balls that go out of bounds stay there and must be hit back in; on difficulty B, the balls stick to the edge of the area. Balls hit near the water can soar over it, or if they land into the water, the ball is placed back where the shot was taken. Balls hit into sand traps will stick to the sides of the traps, and it takes a more powerful swing to free the ball.

The player only uses one club — the amount of time the fire button is held down determines how much power the ball will be hit with, and how far it will go. The player's golfer can be moved anywhere on the field, with his golf club always facing the ball.

On the larger hole, the goal is to hit the ball on to the green. Once the player reaches the green, the game will zoom in on the green. The green is rendered as a light green circle, with a black dot as the actual hole. Once the ball reaches a hole, the player moves on to the next hole.

See also

List of Atari 2600 games

References

External links
Golf at Atari Mania

1980 video games
Atari games
Atari 2600 games
Atari 2600-only games
Golf video games
Video games developed in the United States
Multiplayer and single-player video games